In chemistry, a stepwise reaction (also called an overall reaction, complex reaction, and multistep reaction, among others) is a chemical reaction with one or more reaction intermediates, which by definition involves at least two consecutive elementary reactions.

In a stepwise reaction, not all bonds are broken and formed at the same time. Hence, intermediates appear in the reaction pathway going from the reactants to the products. A stepwise reaction distinguishes itself from an elementary reaction in which the transformation is assumed to occur in a single step and to pass through a single transition state.

In contrast to elementary reactions which follow the law of mass action, the rate law of stepwise reactions is obtained by combining the rate laws of the multiple elementary steps, and can become rather complex. Moreover, when speaking about catalytic reactions, the diffusion may also limit the reaction. In general, however, there is one very slow step, which is the rate-determining step, i.e. the reaction doesn't proceed any faster than the rate-determining step proceeds.

Organic reactions, especially when involving catalysis, are often stepwise. For example, a typical enol reaction consists of at least these elementary steps:
Deprotonation next to (α to) the carbonyl: 
Attack of enolate: 
Rδ+ is an electron acceptor, for example, the carbon of a carbonyl (C=O). A very strong base, usually an alkoxide, is needed for the first step.

Reaction intermediates may be trapped in a trapping reaction. This proves the stepwise nature of the reaction and the structure of the intermediate. For example, superacids were used to prove the existence of carbocations.

See also 
 Chemical reaction
 Elementary reaction
 Rate equation
 Rate-determining step
 Steady state approximation
 Chemical kinetics
 Lindemann mechanism

External links 

Chemical kinetics